The 2007 Georgetown Hoyas football team was an American football team that represented Georgetown University during the 2007 NCAA Division I FCS football season. The Hoyas tied for last in the Patriot League.

In their second year under head coach Kevin Kelly, the Hoyas compiled a 1–10 record. Matt Bassuener, Nnamdi Obiako, Stephen Smith and Kyle Van Fleet were the team captains.

The Hoyas were outscored 415 to 166. Georgetown's 1–5 conference record tied with Bucknell for sixth place in the Patriot League standings.

Georgetown played its home games at Multi-Sport Field on the university campus in Washington, D.C.

Schedule

References

Georgetown
Georgetown Hoyas football seasons
Georgetown Hoyas football